Tandora is a rural locality in the Fraser Coast Region, Queensland, Australia.

Geography

The Mary River forms the south-eastern boundary and much of the southern. The Susan River forms two small sections of the northern boundary.

References 

Fraser Coast Region
Localities in Queensland